Jörg Lütcke (12 December 1975) is a German former professional basketball player.

Biography 
Jörg Lütcke was born on 12 December 1975 in Stuttgart and grew up in Lichterfelde, Berlin. Like his older brother Niklas, he soon joined TuS Lichterfelde, a partner of the basketball club Alba Berlin. After participating in the junior-worldwide Nike Hoop Summit in 1995, he joined Alba Berlin's League One. As a part of the German national team, he played in the European championships of 1997 and 1999, as well as the world championship in 2002.

In 1999 and 2002, Lütcke suffered from cruciate ruptures, enforcing him to take long breaks. Following another injury in 2005, he resigned from his basketball career and studied medicine, becoming an internist. He lives with his wife and four children in Berlin.

Accolades 
 German youth champion in 1989, 1991, 1993, 1994 (TuS Lichterfelde)
 German champion in 1996, 1997, 1998, 1999, 2000, 2001, 2002 (Alba Berlin)
 German Cup winner in 1997, 1999, 2002, 2003 (Alba Berlin)
 German Cup winner in 2004 (RheinEnergy Cologne)
 Bronze medal for World Championship in 2002

References

External links 
 https://www.easycredit-bbl.de/de/statistiken/spieler/portraits/p/1251-joerg-luetcke/

Living people
1975 births
German men's basketball players
Sportspeople from Stuttgart
Alba Berlin players